Arzhanov is a Russian masculine surname, its feminine counterpart is Arzhanova. It originates from ржаной meaning (of) rye. It may refer to:
 Volodymyr Arzhanov (born 1985), Ukrainian football midfielder
 Yevhen Arzhanov (born 1948), Ukrainian middle-distance runner

References 

Russian-language surnames